The Gold and Company Store Building is a historic commercial building in Lincoln, Nebraska. It was built in 1924 for the Gold and Company Store, co-founded by William Gold and later managed by his son Nathan, until its 1964 merger with J. L. Brandeis and Sons. The building was designed in the Gothic Revival and Art Deco styles. It has been listed on the National Register of Historic Places since October 19, 1982.

References

National Register of Historic Places in Lincoln, Nebraska
Gothic Revival architecture in Nebraska
Art Deco architecture in Nebraska
Commercial buildings completed in 1924
1924 establishments in Nebraska